Dala-Järna IK is a Swedish football club located in Dala Järna in Vansbro Municipality, Dalarna County.

Background
Since their foundation Dala-Järna IK has participated mainly in the middle and lower divisions of the Swedish football league system.  The club currently plays in Division 3 Västra Svealand which is the fifth tier of Swedish football. They play their home matches at the Idrottsparken in Dala Järna.

Dala-Järna IK are affiliated to Dalarnas Fotbollförbund.

Recent history
In recent seasons Dala-Järna IK have competed in the following divisions:

2011 – Division 3 västra Svealand
2010 – Division 3 Södra Norrland
2009 – Division 3 Södra Norrland
2008 – Division 3 Södra Norrland
2007 – Division 3 Södra Norrland
2006 – Division 3 Södra Norrland
2005 – Division 4 Dalarna
2004 – Division 4 Dalarna
2003 – Division 3 Södra Norrland
2002 – Division 3 Södra Norrland
2001 – Division 4 Dalarna
2000 – Division 4 Dalarna
1999 – Division 4 Dalarna

Attendances

In recent seasons Dala-Järna IK have had the following average attendances:

Footnotes

External links
 Dala-Järna IK – Official club website
 Dala-Järna IK – Football website

Sport in Dalarna County
Football clubs in Dalarna County
Association football clubs established in 1902
1902 establishments in Sweden